Chapman Way is an American documentary film director and producer. He is best known for producing the Netflix documentary series Untold, Wild Wild Country and The Battered Bastards of Baseball.

Life and career
Chapman was born in Ventura County, California. He is a grandson of actor Bing Russell and nephew of actor Kurt Russell.

In 2014, Chapman directed his debut feature documentary, The Battered Bastards of Baseball, along with Maclain Way, about the Portland Mavericks, premiered at the 2014 Sundance Film Festival and acquired by Netflix as one of their Original documentaries. In 2018, he directed a documentary series, Wild Wild Country, along with Maclain Way for Netflix about the controversial Indian guru Bhagwan Shree Rajneesh (Osho). He directed two documentary films Untold: Crimes and Penalties and Untold: Breaking Point, along with Maclain Way for Netflix in 2021.

Filmography

Awards and nominations

References

External links
 

Living people
American documentary film directors
American documentary film producers
People from California
Year of birth missing (living people)